Diane R. Wolf (1954–2008) was a wealthy arts patron who served on the boards of the John F. Kennedy Center for the Performing Arts, the National Archives and Records Administration, and National Public Radio (NPR), and was a supporter of the Library of Congress, the Smithsonian Institution, the Washington National Opera, and the National Symphony Orchestra.  She also served on the Metropolitan Museum of Art Junior Committee and the Whitney Museum of American Art Friends Council and was a supporter of the Frick Collection, all in New York City.   Through her work as a member of the U.S. Commission of Fine Arts from 1985 to 1990 she became an outspoken advocate for the redesign of American coinage.  Wolf received her undergraduate degree from the University of Pennsylvania in 1976 and a master's degree in early childhood education from Columbia University in 1980.  In 1995, she earned a law degree from Georgetown University Law Center.

References

Additional sources 

 Paul M. Green, The One Person Who Made a Difference, “Numismatic News” (July 4, 1988):  18.
 Thomas E. Luebke, ed., “Civic Art:  A Centennial History of the U.S. Commission of Fine Arts” (Washington, D.C.:  U.S. Commission of Fine Arts, 2013):  Appendix B.
 Bill McAllister, Maverick in the Realm of the Coin, “Washington Post” (December 5, 1989):  C1.
 Timothy Rolands, Wolf Remembers Coinage Redesign Campaign, “Numismatic News” (February 2, 1999):  14.

1954 births
2008 deaths
People from Sapporo
People associated with the Metropolitan Museum of Art
Whitney Museum of American Art
National Archives and Records Administration